Ralph "Buddy" Fletcher (August 20, 1932 – July 25, 2017) was the mayor of Lakeland, Florida from 1993 until 2009. At the end of his tenure he faced ethics complaints. He was succeeded in office by Gow Fields.

Fletcher died on July 25, 2017, at age 84. He is survived by his wife, Marguerite "Weetsie" Fletcher, and their daughter and was preceded in death by three sons.

See also
 List of mayors of Lakeland, Florida

References

1932 births
2017 deaths
People from Lakeland, Florida
Mayors of places in Florida
Deaths from cerebrovascular disease